GVG may refer to:

 Gray Viking Games, LLC
 Greek Volunteer Guard
 Vigabatrin, by designation GVG
 Grass Valley (company)